Vincent J. Cardinal (born August 9, 1960 in Ashtabula, Ohio) is a graduate of Yale School of Drama. He is a playwright and director. He has written The Colorado Catechism and directed Queens Blvd. and Steve Hayes' Hollywood Reunion.

Cardinal is the former chair of the Department of Musical Theatre at the University of Michigan School of Music, Theatre & Dance.

References 

1960 births
Living people
20th-century American dramatists and playwrights
Kent State University alumni
Writers from Akron, Ohio
People from Kent, Ohio
University of Miami faculty
Yale School of Drama alumni
University of Michigan faculty